Otsego County ( ''), formerly known as Okkuddo County, is a county located in the U.S. state of Michigan. As of the 2020 Census, the population was 25,091. The county seat is Gaylord. The county was founded in 1840 and organized in 1875.

Etymology
Otsego may be a Native American name meaning "place of the rock". However, an alternative theory is that it derives from a lake and a county in New York state, which are said to bear the name derived from a Mohawk Iroquoian word meaning either "clear water" or "meeting place." It may be a neologism coined by Henry Schoolcraft, who was a borrower of words and pieces of words from many languages (including Arabic, Greek, Latin, and various American Indian languages).  See List of Michigan county name etymologies.

History

The county was created in 1840 as Okkuddo County (meaning "sickly water," although the reason for using a name with such a negative meaning is lost). The name was changed to Otsego in 1843. It was organized in 1875. On May 20, 2022 an EF3 tornado stuck the county seat of Gaylord killing 2 and injuring 44 while causing major damage to the downtown business district and severely damaging a mobile home park.

Geography
It is the fifth-smallest county by total area in Michigan. Although it is located on Michigan's Lower Peninsula, Otsego County is considered to be part of Northern Michigan.

Otsego County has more than 370 lakes, mostly in the southern part of the county. Other large lakes in the southern part of the county include Big Lake, Big Bear Lake, Buhl Lake, Crapo Lake, Dixon Lake, Douglas Lake, Guthrie Lake, Heart Lake, Lake Tecon, Manuka Lake, Opal Lake, Pencil Lake, and Turtle Lake. The larger lakes in the northern part of the county are Five Lakes, Hardwood Lake, Lake Twenty Seven, and Pickerel Lake. Many of these are so-called 'kettle lakes,' formed by the melting of blocks of glacial ice, left as the glacier retreated, which created a depression in the soil.

Glaciers shaped the area, creating a unique regional ecosystem. A large portion of the area is the Grayling outwash plain, a broad outwash plain including sandy ice-disintegration ridges; jack pine barrens, some white pine-red pine forest, and northern hardwood forest. Large lakes were created by glacial action.

Headwaters of the Au Sable, Black, Manistee, Pigeon, and Sturgeon Rivers are in Otsego County. The Au Sable River watershed is the county's largest watershed.

Adjacent counties

 Cheboygan County - north
 Montmorency County - east
 Oscoda County - southeast
 Crawford County - south
 Kalkaska County - southwest
 Antrim County - west
 Charlevoix County - northwest

Transportation

State-maintained highways
  is a north–south freeway the runs through central Otsego County, bypassing Gaylord to the west. The route serves as Michigan's major north–south thoroughfare, cities such as Detroit, Flint, and Saginaw with Northern Michigan and the Upper Peninsula.
  is a loop route serving businesses and tourists in the city of Gaylord. It shares a short concurrency with M-32.
  is an east–west route, running across much of the width of the northern Lower Peninsula. Including Gaylord, the highway serves communities such as East Jordan, Elmira, Johannesburg, Atlanta, Hillman, and Alpena.
  is a former highway that was removed from Otsego County in 1961. The route has since been supplanted by I-75, and is today referred to as "Old 27".

County-designated highways 

  is an east–west route that connects the community of Otsego Lake to US Highway 131 (US 131) at Mancelona.
  is an east–west route serving as a cutoff between M-32 near Gaylord and US 131 at Alba.
  is an east–west route in northwest Otsego County, connecting Boyne Falls and eastern Charlevoix County to Old US 27 and Vanderbilt.
  is a north–south route running along the Otsego–Montmorency county line.
  is an east–west route serving southeastern Otsego County and the Montmorency County community of Lewiston.
  serves as a southern bypass of Gaylord, running parallel to M-32.
  parallels M-32 to the north, east of Gaylord.
  is a north–south route that serves southern Otsego County, and extends south into Crawford, Roscommon, and Gladwin counties.

Airport
Gaylord Regional Airport – on SW edge of Gaylord, owned and operated by Otsego County, is a General Utility Airport. It is listed as a tier one airport in all categories of the Michigan Airport System Plan.

Demographics

As of the 2000 United States Census, there were 23,301 people, 8,995 households, and 6,539 families residing in the county. The population density was 45 people per square mile (17/km2). There were 13,375 housing units at an average density of 26 per square mile (10/km2). The racial makeup of the county was 97.51% White, 0.18% Black or African American, 0.62% Native American, 0.34% Asian, 0.04% Pacific Islander, 0.15% from other races, and 1.16% from two or more races. 0.75% of the population were Hispanic or Latino of any race. 22.1% were of German, 17.6% Polish, 10.5% Irish, 9.9% English and 9.4% American ancestry. 96.8% spoke English and 1.3% Polish as their first language.

There were 8,995 households, out of which 34.10% had children under the age of 18 living with them, 60.40% were married couples living together, 8.30% had a female householder with no husband present, and 27.30% were non-families. 22.50% of all households were made up of individuals, and 9.10% had someone living alone who was 65 years of age or older. The average household size was 2.56 and the average family size was 3.00.

The county population contained 26.80% under the age of 18, 7.00% from 18 to 24, 28.50% from 25 to 44, 24.00% from 45 to 64, and 13.70% who were 65 years of age or older. The median age was 38 years. For every 100 females there were 98.60 males. For every 100 females age 18 and over, there were 96.70 males.

The median income for a household in the county was $40,876, and the median income for a family was $46,628. Males had a median income of $34,413 versus $21,204 for females. The per capita income for the county was $19,810. About 5.30% of families and 6.80% of the population were below the poverty line, including 7.50% of those under age 18 and 7.10% of those age 65 or over.

Government
Otsego County voters have been reliably Republican from the start. They have selected the Republican Party nominee in 88% of national elections (30 of 34).

Political Culture

The county government operates the jail, maintains rural roads, operates the major local courts, records deeds, mortgages, and vital records, administers public health regulations, and participates with the state in the provision of social services. The county board of commissioners controls the budget and has limited authority to make laws or ordinances. In Michigan, most local government functions — police and fire, building and zoning, tax assessment, street maintenance, etc. — are the responsibility of individual cities and townships.

Elected officials

 Prosecuting Attorney: Michael A. Rola
 Sheriff: Matthew Nowicki
 County Clerk/Register of Deeds: Susan I. DeFeyter
 County Treasurer: Diann M. Axford
 County Surveyor: Ronald C. Brand

(information as of September 2005)

Media
The Gaylord Herald Times is the newspaper of record for Otsego County. It is published twice weekly, and is the oldest surviving business. It was founded in 1875, the year that the county was organized.

Communities

City
 Gaylord (county seat)

Village
 Vanderbilt

Civil townships

 Bagley Township
 Charlton Township
 Chester Township
 Corwith Township
 Dover Township
 Elmira Township
 Hayes Township
 Livingston Township
 Otsego Lake Township

Unincorporated communities

 Arbutus Beach
 Elmira (partial)
 Eyedylwild Beach
 Farrar Landing
 Green Timbers
 Hetherton (partial)
 Johannesburg
 Lower Chub Landing
 Oak Grove
 Otsego Lake
 Pearll City
 Sparr
 Vienna Corners (partial)
 Waters
 Whites Landing

See also
 List of Michigan State Historic Sites in Otsego County, Michigan
 National Register of Historic Places listings in Otsego County, Michigan

References

External links

 
 Enchanted forest, Northern Michigan source for information, calendars, etc.
 Gaylord Herald Times home page
 Otsego Community Connection
 Otsego County Historical Society
 Otsego County home page
 Gaylord Regional Airport Information
 Soil Survey of Otsego County, U.S. Department of Agriculture, Michigan State University Agricultural Extension Service (lots more here, such as history, economy, etc.)

 
Michigan counties
1875 establishments in Michigan
Populated places established in 1875